Jayson Thomas Blair (born March 23, 1976) is an American former journalist who worked for The New York Times. He resigned from the newspaper in May 2003 in the wake of the discovery of fabrication and plagiarism in his stories.

Blair published a memoir of this period, titled Burning Down My Masters' House (2004), recounting his career, a diagnosis of bipolar disorder after his resignation, and his view of race relations at the newspaper. He later established a support group for people with bipolar disorder and became a life coach.

Background
Blair was born in Columbia, Maryland, the son of a federal executive and a schoolteacher. While attending the University of Maryland, College Park, he was a student journalist. For the 1996–1997 academic year, he was selected as the second African-American editor-in-chief of its student newspaper, The Diamondback. According to a 2004 article by the Baltimore Sun, "some of his fellow students opposed his selection describing him as 'an elbows-out competitor.'"

After a summer interning at The New York Times in 1998, Blair was offered an extended internship there. He declined in order to complete more coursework for graduation, but returned to the Times in June 1999 with a year of coursework left to complete. That November, he was classified as an "intermediate reporter." He was later promoted to a full reporter and then to editor.

Plagiarism and fabrication scandal
On April 28, 2003, Blair received a call from Times national editor James Roberts asking him about similarities between a story he had written two days earlier and one published April 18 by San Antonio Express-News reporter Macarena Hernandez. The senior editor of the Express-News had contacted the Times about the similarities between Blair's article in the Times and Hernandez's article in his paper.

The resulting inquiry led to the discovery of fabrication and plagiarism in a number of articles written by Blair. Some fabrications include Blair's claims to have traveled to the city mentioned in the dateline, when in fact he did not.

Questionable articles include the following:
In the October 30, 2002 piece "US Sniper Case Seen as a Barrier to a Confession", Blair wrote that a dispute between police authorities had ruined the interrogation of Beltway sniper suspect John Muhammad and that Muhammad was about to confess, quoting unnamed officials. This was swiftly denied by everyone involved. Blair also named certain lawyers, who were not present, as having witnessed the interrogation.
In the February 10, 2003 piece "Peace and Answers Eluding Victims of the Sniper Attacks", Blair claimed to be in Washington. He allegedly plagiarized quotations from a Washington Post story and fabricated quotations from a person he had never interviewed. Blair ascribed a wide range of attributes to a man featured in the article, almost all of which the man in question denied. Blair also published information that he had promised was to be off the record.
In the March 3, 2003 piece "Making Sniper Suspect Talk Puts Detective in Spotlight", Blair claimed to be in Fairfax, Virginia. He described a videotape of Lee Malvo, the younger defendant in the case, being questioned by police and quoted officials' review of the tape. No such tape existed. Blair also claimed a detective noticed blood on a man's jeans leading to a confession, which had not occurred.
In the March 27, 2003 piece "Relatives of Missing Soldiers Dread Hearing Worse News", Blair claimed to be in West Virginia. He allegedly plagiarized quotations from an Associated Press article. He claimed to have spoken to the father of Jessica Lynch, who had no recollection of meeting Blair; said "tobacco fields and cattle pastures" were visible from Lynch's parents' house when they were not; erroneously stated that Lynch's brother was in the National Guard; misspelled Lynch's mother's name; and fabricated a dream that he claimed she had had.
In the April 3, 2003 piece "Rescue in Iraq and a 'Big Stir' in West Virginia", Blair claimed to have covered the Lynch story from her hometown of Palestine, West Virginia. Blair never traveled to Palestine, and his entire contribution to the story consisted of rearranged details from Associated Press stories.
In the April 7, 2003 piece "For One Pastor, the War Hits Home", Blair wrote of a church service in Cleveland and an interview with the minister. Blair never went to Cleveland; he spoke to the minister by telephone, and copied portions of the article from an earlier Washington Post article. He also plagiarized quotations from The Plain Dealer and New York Daily News. He fabricated a detail about the minister keeping a picture of his son inside his Bible and got the name of the church wrong.
In the April 19, 2003 piece "In Military Wards, Questions and Fears from the Wounded", Blair described interviewing four injured soldiers in a naval hospital. He had never gone to the hospital and had spoken to only one soldier by telephone, to whom he later attributed made-up quotes. Blair wrote that the soldier "will most likely limp the rest of his life and need to use a cane", which was untrue. He said another soldier had lost his right leg when it had been amputated below the knee. He described two soldiers as being in the hospital at the same time, but they were admitted five days apart.

After internal investigations, The New York Times reported on Blair's journalistic misdeeds in an "unprecedented" 7,239-word front-page story on May 11, 2003, headlined "Times Reporter Who Resigned Leaves Long Trail of Deception." The story called the affair "a low point in the 152-year history of the newspaper."

After the scandal broke, some 30 former staffers of The Diamondback, who had worked with Blair when he was editor-in-chief at the university newspaper, signed a 2003 letter alleging that Blair had made four serious errors as a reporter and editor while at the University of Maryland. They said these and his work habits brought his integrity into question. The letter-signers alleged that questions raised by some of these staffers at the time were ignored by Maryland Media, Inc. (MMI), the board that owned the paper.

Aftermath
The investigation, known as the Siegal committee, found heated debate among the staff over affirmative action hiring, as Blair is black. Jonathan Landman, Blair's editor, told the Siegal committee he felt that Blair's being black played a large part in the younger man's initial promotion in 2001 to full-time staffer. "I think race was the decisive factor in his promotion," he said. "I thought then and I think now that it was the wrong decision."

Others disagreed. Five days later, New York Times op-ed columnist Bob Herbert, an African American, asserted in his column that race had nothing to do with the Blair case:

"Listen up: the race issue in this case is as bogus as some of Jayson Blair's reporting." Herbert said, "[F]olks who delight in attacking anything black, or anything designed to help blacks, have pounced on the Blair story as evidence that there is something inherently wrong with The New York Timess effort to diversify its newsroom, and beyond that, with the very idea of a commitment to diversity or affirmative action anywhere. And while these agitators won't admit it, the nasty subtext to their attack is that there is something inherently wrong with blacks."

Executive editor Howell Raines and managing editor Gerald Boyd resigned after losing newsroom support in the aftermath of the scandal.

After resigning from the Times, Blair struggled with severe depression and, according to his memoir, entered a hospital for treatment. He was diagnosed with bipolar disorder for the first time. He has acknowledged that he had been self-medicating when he was dealing with substance abuse of alcohol and cocaine in earlier years.

Later career
Blair later returned to college to complete his postponed degree.

The year after he left the Times, Blair wrote a memoir, Burning Down My Master's House, published by New Millennium Books in 2004. Its initial print run was 250,000 copies; some 1,400 were sold in its first nine days. Although most reviews were critical, sales of the book increased after Blair was interviewed by Larry King and Fox News Channel host Bill O'Reilly.

In his book, Blair revealed extended substance abuse, which he had ended before he resigned from the newspaper, and a struggle with bipolar disorder, which was diagnosed and first treated after he resigned. He also discussed journalistic practices at the Times, and his view of race relations and disagreements among senior editors at the newspaper.

In 2006, Blair was running a support group for people with bipolar disorder, for which he has received continuing treatment.
In 2007 he became a life coach, working in Virginia, opening his own coaching center five years later. He was still working in this field in 2016.

In popular culture
 Choke Point, the play written by Colm Byrne and produced in 2007, is based on Blair's downfall.
A play about Blair, CQ/CX, written by Gabe McKinley, was produced by the Atlantic Theater Company in 2012. McKinley knew Blair personally, having worked at the Times during the period Blair was there.
 Law & Order used the Blair story as the inspiration for Episode 14.02: "Bounty."
 In Law & Order: Criminal Intent, the Blair story inspired an episode about a young journalist in the third season episode "Pravda" (3.5).
 Season 5 of the HBO series The Wire dealt with the subject of journalist fabrication, as well as the decline of print journalism. It mentions Jayson Blair in the last episode. The Wire creator David Simon had been a Baltimore Sun journalist and worked on The Diamondback, the student newspaper at the University of Maryland, College Park, where Blair was editor.
 A 2003 series of Pearls Before Swine comic strips portray Rat writing fraudulent New York Times stories on former Iraqi dictator Saddam Hussein.
 A scene in Gilmore Girls episode "The Reigning Lorelai" (4.16) shows Rory's editor, Doyle, becoming frustrated with the way Yale Daily News staffers act in the newsroom, calling it "the breeding ground for the next Jayson Blair."
A documentary film featuring Jayson Blair was made by director/producer Samantha Grant. A Fragile Trust premiered at the Sheffield International Documentary Film Festival on June 14, 2013.
 An episode of The Simpsons based a joke on the Blair story in Episode 15.22: "Fraudcast News." Milhouse tells Lisa he's sorry but a story he "filed from Baghdad was all made up, (he) was actually in Basrah."
 During the White House Correspondents' Dinner in 2008, Craig Ferguson remarked, "The New York Times unfortunately did not buy a table. They feel -- I just want to make sure I get this right -- they felt that this event undercuts the credibility of the press.  It's funny, you see I thought that Jayson Blair and Judy Miller took care of that."

See also
 Judith Miller
 Brian Williams
 Sabrina Erdely
 Wendy Bergen
 Jack Kelley
 Janet Cooke
 Johann Hari
 Journalism scandals
 Kevin Deutsch
 Stephen Glass
 Ruth Shalit
 Claas Relotius
 Fake news

Bibliography

References

Further reading
 "N.Y. Times Uncovers Dozens of Faked Stories by Reporter", Washington Post.  May 11, 2003.
 Kugler, Sara. "New York Times executives Howell Raines, Gerald Boyd resign", Associated Press. June 5, 2003.
 "Making a Turnaround," bp Magazine (bphope.com). Spring 2005. Retrieved 2010-12-06.
 "Jayson Blair searches for new life, reflects on legacy." Fairfax County Times. June 9, 2005.
 "Blair: Outsourcing EAP [NYT's employee assistance program] is a mistake", Romenesko Media News (Poynter Institute). June 15, 2005.

External links
 

  Goose Creek Coaching and Consulting, Blair's company
Global coverage of articles on the story at Journalism.org
Q&A: Jayson Blair via mediabistro
 

American newspaper reporters and correspondents
Journalistic hoaxes
Journalistic scandals
African-American writers
Writers from New York (state)
Writers from Maryland
University of Maryland, College Park alumni
People from Columbia, Maryland
People with bipolar disorder
1976 births
Fake news in the United States
Living people
People involved in plagiarism controversies
Hoaxes in the United States
The New York Times writers
20th-century African-American people